Leon Pancaldo, also called Leone Pancaldo (1488 or 1490 – 1538) was a Genoese explorer.

Pancaldo was born in Savona in 1488 or 1490. He participated in the first circumnavigation of the globe led by Ferdinand Magellan. He was captured by the Portuguese in the Moluccas and was held prisoner for a long time.

In 1534 he attempted another voyage, but in 1538 he died at the River Plate in South America, possibly following conflicts with indigenous people.

Commemoration
 The main tower in Savona and a street there are named after him.
 The World War 2 Italian Navigatori class destroyer Leone Pancaldo was named in his honour.

1538 deaths
People from Savona
Explorers from the Republic of Genoa
Year of birth uncertain